Olav Anton (born 28 July 1954 – August 2022) was an Estonian politician. He was a member of VII and VIII Riigikogu.

Anton was born in Tartu and is a 1977 graduate of the Estonian Agricultural University, with a degree in electrical engineering.

References

Living people
1954 births
Estonian Centre Party politicians
Members of the Riigikogu, 1992–1995
Members of the Riigikogu, 1995–1999
Estonian University of Life Sciences alumni
Politicians from Tartu